Robert Ashley Smith (July 20, 1890 – December 27, 1965) was a professional baseball player who played pitcher in the Major Leagues from -. Smith played for the Chicago White Sox and Buffalo Blues.

After his baseball career, Smith served in the United States Army during World War I and worked as a real estate broker.

References

External links

1890 births
1965 deaths
People from Woodbury, Vermont
Major League Baseball pitchers
Baseball players from Vermont
Chicago White Sox players
Buffalo Buffeds players
Buffalo Blues players
Vancouver Beavers players
Boise Irrigators players
Minneapolis Millers (baseball) players
Springfield Tips players